The Laking Baronetcy, of Kensington in the Parish of Saint Mary Abbots in the Royal Borough of Kensington in the County of London, was a title in the Baronetage of the United Kingdom. It was created on 24 July 1902 for Sir Francis Laking, Physician-in-Ordinary to Edward VII and George V. His son, the second Baronet, was an art historian and the first keeper of the London Museum. The title became extinct on the early death of the latter's son, the third Baronet, in 1930.

Laking baronets, of Kensington (1902)
Sir Francis Henry Laking, 1st Baronet (1847–1914)
Sir Guy Francis Laking, 2nd Baronet (1875–1919)
Sir Guy Francis William Laking, 3rd Baronet (1904–1930) Baronetcy became extinct after his death. 
 Joan Frances Laking

References

Extinct baronetcies in the Baronetage of the United Kingdom